Patrik "Peo" Eriksson-Ohlsson (born 9 August 1974) is a Swedish former footballer who played as a defender. He made 69 Allsvenskan appearances for Djurgårdens IF and scored three goals, as well as 47 appearances and three goals for GIF Sundsvall

He is the younger brother of Jan Eriksson.

Honours

 Djurgårdens IF
 Allsvenskan: 2002, 2003

References

Swedish footballers
Allsvenskan players
Djurgårdens IF Fotboll players
GIF Sundsvall players
1974 births
Living people
Association football defenders